A. gigantea may refer to:
 Aechmea gigantea, a plant species endemic to Venezuela
 Agathia gigantea, a moth species found in Java, Sumatra, Peninsular Malaysia and Borneo
 Agrostis gigantea, the redtop, a perennial grass native to Europe
 Aldabrachelys gigantea, a giant tortoise species of the Seychelles.
 Aristolochia gigantea, the Brazilian Dutchman's pipe or giant pelican flower, an ornamental plant species
Arundinaria gigantea, a North American bamboo